This is a list of the members of the Riigikogu, following the 2015 election.

Election results

Lists

By party

Estonian Reform Party (30)

Estonian Centre Party (27)

Social Democratic Party (15)

Pro Patria and Res Publica Union (14)

Free Party (8)

Conservative People's Party (7)

By votes

References

13th